Princess Kasuga no Yamada (? – d. 539) was Empress of Japan as the consort of Emperor Ankan.

Daughter of Emperor Ninken. Married in 513.

Notes

Japanese empresses
Year of death missing
6th-century Japanese women
Japanese princesses
539 deaths